Caio Facó (born May 16, 1992) is a Brazilian composer.

Biography 
Facó worked as a composer in residence for Ensemble MPMP (Portugal, 2017) and Orquestra de Câmara de Valdivia (Chile, 2017–19). He also worked with the International Contemporary Ensemble (USA), Mivos Quartet (USA) and Orquestra Metropolitana de Lisboa (Portugal). He won, for three consecutive years (2016–18), the most prestigious composition contest in Brazil: Festival Tinta Fresca. In Brazil, his works are performed by Orquestra Sinfônica do Estado de São Paulo and Orquestra Filarmônica de Minas Gerais. The Orquestra Sinfônica do Estado de São Paulo recently announced Caio Facó as the Composer in Residence of the 2021 season.

Selected works

Chamber orchestra 
 Diário das Narrativas Fantásticas (2019)
 As veias abertas da América Latina (2018)

Large orchestra 
 O tear das histórias do Sol (2022)
 Ensaio sobre Cores e Sombras (2018)
 Pandora (2017)
 Aproximações Áureas (2016)

Chamber music 
 Goldberg – Diálogos entre duas Eras (2021)
 O lugar de todas as coisas (2021)
 Cangaceiros e Fanáticos (2018)
 Reminiscências (2017)
 Sopros do Estuário (2017)
 Ritos das Senhoras da Terra (2017)
 As Vozes das Labaredas do Sertão (2017)
 O Príncipe de Venosa (2016)
 Canções Errantes (2016)

References 

Living people
20th-century classical composers
21st-century classical composers
Brazilian classical composers
1992 births